Nassarius coronatus, common name the crown nassa or the coronated dog whelk, is a species of sea snail, a marine gastropod mollusc in the family Nassariidae, the Nassa mud snails or dog whelks.

Description
The length of the shell varies between 18 mm and 35 mm. It is similar to Nassarius arcularia plicatus, but has a more elongated spire, a smooth surface and less flaring columella. The aperture is dark brown with a light band.

The ovate shell is inflated, smooth and polished. The shell is of a variable color, bluish ash, reddish or brown, covered with narrow, white, longitudinal lines, irregularly spread over it. A deeper zone surrounds the suture, and two or three others are found upon the body whorl, that of the middle much more marked, and sometimes the only one. The spire is composed of six convex whorls, slightly flattened at their upper part, and crowned by a row of rounded tubercles. The three or four upper whorls are folded longitudinally, and intersected by transverse striae. The aperture is ovate, notched at the top of the outer lip, with a ridge upon the inner lip. The depth of the cavity is brown, and marked with a whitish band. The outer lip is thin upon the edge, crowned throughout its whole length with small, short, and pointed denticulations, furnished internally with numerous transverse striae. The columella is arcuated, covered by the inner lip which extends upon the body of the body whorl in a white, rather thick callosity, loaded towards the base with some slightly apparent guttules, and terminated by small spinous points.

Distribution
This species can be found on shallow sands in the Red Sea and the Gulf of Oman; in the Indo-Pacific off Aldabra, the east coast of South Africa, Kenya, Madagascar, the Mascarene Basin, Mauritius, Mozambique and Tanzania; off Indonesia, the Philippines, Japan, the Solomon Islands and Australia (Northern Territory, Queensland, Western Australia).

References

 Bruguière, J.G. 1789. Buccinum. Encyclopédie Méthodique ou par de matieres. Historie Naturelle des Vers et Mollusques 1: 236–285
 Philippi, R.A. 1849. Centuria altera testaceorum novorum. Zeitschrift für Malakozoologie 5(9): 129–144
 Dautzenberg, P. 1923. Liste Préliminaire des Mollusques marins de Madagascar et description de deux epèces nouvelles. Journal de Conchyliologie 68(1): 21–74 
 Dautzenberg, Ph. (1929). Contribution à l'étude de la faune de Madagascar: Mollusca marina testacea. Faune des colonies françaises, III(fasc. 4). Société d'Editions géographiques, maritimes et coloniales: Paris. 321–636, plates IV-VII pp. 
 Cernohorsky W. O. (1984). Systematics of the family Nassariidae (Mollusca: Gastropoda). Bulletin of the Auckland Institute and Museum 14: 1–356
 Marais J.P. & Kilburn R.N. (2010) Nassariidae. pp. 138–173, in: Marais A.P. & Seccombe A.D. (eds), Identification guide to the seashells of South Africa. Volume 1. Groenkloof: Centre for Molluscan Studies. 376 pp

External links
  Branch, G.M. et al. (2002). Two Oceans. 5th impression. David Philip, Cate Town & Johannesburg
 
 

Nassariidae
Gastropods described in 1789